Harlem Simiona is a New Zealand born footballer with heritage from the Cook Islands, who plays as a forward for Ngongotaha as well as the Cook Islands national football team.

Career

International
Simiona qualified to represent the Cook Islands through his grandfather, receiving his first call up to the squad in August 2015, for the 2018 FIFA World Cup qualification matches against American Samoa, Samoa and Tonga.

Career statistics

International

Statistics accurate as of match played 4 September 2015

References

External links
 
 

Living people
Association football forwards
Cook Islands international footballers
Cook Island footballers
Sportspeople from Rotorua
New Zealand sportspeople of Cook Island descent
1992 births